Mustafa Karim Abdullah (born 21 July 1987) is an Iraqi footballer. He last played for Al-Talaba. He plays as striker, and is known for his ability to score with both feet.

Career: Youth, Olympic and National Team

Youth Team
In 2005, Mustafa Karim took part with Iraq Youth team in the AFC Youth Championship Qualification, scored the qualifying goal against Kuwait and sent Iraq to the AFC Youth Championship 2006, but he couldn't join the team due to injury.

Olympic Team
In 2006, Mustafa Karim won the Silver Medal in the Asian Games with Iraq Olympic team. Mustafa Karim scored 4 goals in the Asian Games, 2 goals against Indonesia and one goal against Singapore in the 1st Round, while his fourth goal was the most precious goal against Malaysia, Iraq was leading the match 3-0 against Malaysia and Iraq needed a 4-0 win to qualify to the quarterfinals as the best second place runner, Mustafa Karim substituted in and scored the 4th goal from the first touch to send the Iraq Olympic team to the quarterfinals.

In 2007, Iraq Olympic team failed to qualify to the 2008 Olympic Games and finished behind Australia by 1 point, Mustafa Karim played most of the Olympic Games qualifications matches as substitution, and scored only 2 goals.

Al Zawraa

Mustafa Karim Signed for Iraqi champions Al Zawraa from Naft Al Wasat on the January transfer window of 2017. He made his debut as a second half substitute Vs Al-Hedood and scored the winning goal in the dying moments of the match.

In 2008, Mustafa Karim made his debut to the Iraq national team in a friendly match against Jordan On 24 January 2008.

Clubs Achievements
2004-2005
 Mustafa Karim won Iraqi League Top scorer award with 16 Goals, and he was only 17 years old.

2005-2006
 Mustafa Karim was the Iraqi League Top scorer runner-up with 14 Goals, and he was only 18 years old.

2006-2007
 Mustafa Karim won his first League title with Arbil FC.

2007-2008
 Mustafa Karim join the Egyptian giant club Ismaily SC
 Voted as best Foreign player in Egyptian Premier League 2007.

2008-2009
 Egyptian Premier League Top scorers runner-up with 11 Goals, 1 goal behind the Top scorers.
 Egyptian Premier League runner-up with Ismaily SC, had to play a play-off match against Al Ahly to decide the champion.

International goals
Scores and results list Iraq's goal tally first.

Honours

Country 
 2006 Asian Games Silver medallist.
 2012 Arab Nations Cup Bronze medallist
 2013 World Men's Military Cup: Champions

Club
 Won the 2006–07 Iraqi Premier League with Erbil.
 Won the 2016–17 Iraq FA Cup with Al-Zawraa.

Individual
 2004–05 Iraqi Premier League top scorer
 Best foreign player in the Egyptian Premier League in 2007
 2016–17 Iraq FA Cup top scorer

References

External links 
Mustafa Karim's League Statistics on Ismaily Official website
Profile on goalzz.com
Mustafa Karim Compilation

1987 births
2011 AFC Asian Cup players
Al-Sailiya SC players
Baniyas Club players
Iraqi expatriate sportspeople in Egypt
Expatriate footballers in Egypt
Expatriate footballers in the United Arab Emirates
Expatriate footballers in Qatar
Iraq international footballers
Iraqi expatriate footballers
Iraqi footballers
Ismaily SC players
Living people
Sportspeople from Baghdad
Sharjah FC players
Asian Games medalists in football
Footballers at the 2006 Asian Games
Al-Shorta SC players
Al-Mina'a SC players
UAE Pro League players
Egyptian Premier League players
Qatar Stars League players
Asian Games silver medalists for Iraq
Association football forwards
Medalists at the 2006 Asian Games